Nokia Lumia 800 (codenamed 'Sea Ray') is a smartphone from Nokia, first unveiled on 26 October 2011 at the Nokia World 2011 event. It originally ran on Windows Phone 7.5 "Mango" and was Nokia's first device to run the Windows Phone operating system marking the company's shift from Symbian for their smartphones. It was Nokia's flagship upon the original release in Europe in November 2011, and was thus also a highly important product for Nokia's mobile phone business.

Lumia 800 shares its design with the previously released MeeGo-based Nokia N9 and it was originally Meego CDMA-variant for Verizon with codename RM-716 Searay. The outward differences are one added physical button dedicated to the camera on the right side of the phone, and a dual LED flash moved directly above the Carl Zeiss camera lens. Despite a similar exterior, the Lumia 800 has a different interior than N9. Lumia 800's chipset comes from Qualcomm, whereas the N9 is based on a Texas Instruments OMAP chipset and CPU. Like the N9, it has a convex-curved Gorilla Glass AMOLED PenTile screen with a ClearBlack antiglare filter. The screen diagonal is 3.7 inches (800 x 480 pixels), compared with 3.9 inches (854 x 480 pixels) for N9, to conform with the Windows Phone specifications list, which includes three capacitive softkeys placed under the glass. A through-colored unibody shell is made from polycarbonate plastic.

It was replaced as the flagship by Nokia Lumia 900, which was originally released for the American market through AT&T before its worldwide release. On 5 September 2012, the Nokia Lumia 820, the successor of the Nokia Lumia 800, was presented. The improvements are Windows Phone 8, dual core processor, front camera, wireless charging option, exchangeable covers, and bigger screen.

History
A "Sea Ray" prototype smartphone was presented by Nokia CEO Stephen Elop at a private gathering in Espoo on 23 June 2011, two days after the introduction of the Nokia N9 in Singapore. The device's design was pretty much the same as the N9, except that it functionally ran on Windows Phone 7.5 ("Mango" update). Elop called on the audience to turn off their cameras because the device was "super confidential", but photos and a full video clip leaked on the internet, leading to reporters calling it naive or cynical. As a result, some in the media believed the presentation to be a "publicity stunt".

Software
The Lumia 800 device comes with four Nokia-exclusive applications not included by the default Windows Phone OS: Nokia Drive, a free turn-by-turn navigation system; Nokia Maps; Nokia Music, a free streaming music service and music store; and App Highlights, a service suggesting software based on location and operator. In addition to these applications and services, Microsoft added Office 365, in which the user can edit documents, create spreadsheets, open PowerPoint presentations, and even make OneNote files. The files created can be stored on Microsoft's SkyDrive cloud service, on the phone itself, and other areas.

Nokia Collection

In addition to pre-installed Nokia-exclusive Windows Phone applications, the Windows Phone Marketplace contains a Nokia Collection section. As of April 2012, it contains the following additional applications: Nokia Transport, a location-aware public transport schedule and navigation application; Creative Studio, a photo editing application; TuneIn Radio, a local and global radio streaming application; CNN, a news reader and video viewer for the Cable News Network; and WRC Live, an application to follow live timing and media from the FIA WRC series.

Diagnostic Tool
Just like the Lumia 900, the 800 comes with a diagnostic tool.
It can be accessed by pressing ##634# on the dial keypad, which should initiate the download after the last # is pressed. The diagnostic tool should appear on the app list under Diagnostics.

On this diagnostic tool, a user can run tests on the following: Accelerometer, ALS, audio loopback, camera, battery status, DTMF, gyroscope, hardware buttons, headset detection, LCD white, lights, life timer, magnetometer, power source, proximity, speaker, touch and vibration. It's also possible to perform all the tests in one run. The application is intended to be used by device engineers to run tests to find whether a certain component is working properly. The app is uninstallable.

Limitation to WP7 
According to Microsoft, due to platform architecture change, WP7 phones, based on the CE kernel, will not be upgradeable to Windows Phone 8, based on the NT kernel, which was released in the fall of 2012. Instead, Microsoft has released Windows Phone 7.8 in January 2013, which includes some WP8 features for existing WP7 phones.

Release

The Lumia 800 device was presented along with Lumia 710 by Nokia's CEO Stephen Elop at the Nokia World conference in London October 2011. In the presentation referred to their devices as 'the first real Windows Phones'.

The London launch was promoted with a massive sound and light show. Nokia and Canadian-based DJ deadmau5 illuminated the banks of the River Thames and the Millbank Tower with a state-of-the-art music and laser show. According to The Daily Telegraph, "The 118 metre building was turned into a canvas for a state-of-the-art light show during which the London skyscraper seemed to buckle and twist".

As the first flagship result of its alliance with Microsoft announced eight months earlier, it was a highly important product for Nokia. Only a week before the launch, Nokia posted a second consecutive quarterly loss, making it even more vital for their fortunes to succeed.

Nokia outsourced the production of its Qualcomm-based Lumia 800 to Compal Electronics. According to Nokia, this was due to time constraints and Compal's experience with the chipset. Future models, starting from Lumia 710, would be built in a Nokia factory, according to the same source. Devices for the European and Northern American markets are configured, tested and packed by Nokia's factory in Salo, Finland.

The Lumia 800 was released in Canada but not the United States. On 9 January 2012, the Nokia Lumia 900 was announced as a parallel model with a gyroscope, LTE support, a larger display, front-facing camera for video conferencing, and its main (back) camera improved for focus and color balance, additional features over the 800 that would make it better appeal to American consumers.

Reception
As of 26 January 2012, Nokia announced they had sold "well over 1 million Lumia devices to date", better than what was expected by analysts.

European carriers have stated that Nokia Lumia phones are not good enough to compete with Apple iPhone or Samsung Galaxy phones, that "they are overpriced for what is not an innovative product" and that "No one comes into the store and asks for a Windows phone".

Nokia Lumia 800 won the "Editor's Choice" award of 2011 from What Mobile magazine. Their review rated it 5/5, commending that "[t]he Lumia 800 is a massive step forward for Nokia and sits apart in an increasingly crowded market. Alongside Windows Phone Mango, there's enough inside the Lumia 800 to worry rivals and make iPhone fans jealous."

Brian Klug of AnandTech in his review wrote: "The Lumia 800 is indubitably the best Windows Phone hardware out there right now," with notable features such as "[a] camera without compromises, hardware build quality that's unique and solid, Nokia's attention to detail..." With regard to the device's shortcomings, Klug mentioned "lack of USB or external storage, a still fledgling application ecosystem, and a few others." Regarding the camera, Brian Klug added: "Lumia 800's camera comes out looking very good against the rest of the 8MP competition, and for me this is the first F/2.2 8 MP shooter I've come across. With less compression and better ISP, it could be even better than most."

In an Engadget review, Sharif Sakr wrote: "Nokia's Lumia 800 is a sophisticated and capable smartphone that melds its hardware beautifully with the Windows Phone OS." Sakr writes that while the phone lacked features like USB mass storage and expandable storage, the phone is welcome for those who want to be "part of a carefully crafted, simple and generally happy emerging ecosystem."

PC World reported that Nokia Lumia 800 has solid guts and shiny looks, and was an "interesting proposal", though they also said it had "nothing extraordinary to offer" when compared to the highest-end models of Samsung Galaxy Nexus, Motorola Droid RAZR, or the more expensive iPhone 4S in hardware and software.

Cnet UK noted that "overall, the Lumia 800 is a very good handset. The Windows Phone software is slick and fun to use, especially if you like to keep up-to-date with what friends are up to on social networking sites. It also looks attractive and the excellent build quality gives you the confidence that it's built to last." CNET UK made a camera comparison with current (as of early 2012) high-end phones iPhone 4S and Samsung Galaxy S II, and wrote that Lumia 800 "didn't offer the quality of camera we were hoping for." Regarding the camera, GSM Arena wrote, that "We were quite impressed by the job done by the 8 megapixel sensor and the bright F/2.2 lens. Images might not be the sharpest around and the noise levels are only average, but their colors and contrast are great, despite the sub-optimal lighting. Cameraphone lovers should definitely check this one out."

Ketaki Bhojnagarwala in The Hindu review wrote, "The Lumia 800 isn't perfect, but its one of the best products that Nokia has released in the market in recent months. I have no complaints about the hardware – Nokia gets it right every time. Windows Mango is a refreshing and vibrant operating system that's already got a big fan list,..."

In an opinion review by Matthew Baxter-Reynolds of The Guardian, after using Nokia Lumia 800 for a month and being a previous iPhone user, he argued that Lumia 800 is not up to an iPhone. In summary, he wrote: "I really wanted Windows Phone to work for me. This was £400 of my own money spent to try it. But it just doesn't work well enough to be the small-scale personal computer that I must have on me all the time."

Reported problems
 On-screen keyboard disappearing during typing. Nokia has addressed the problem with a software fix in the update 8107.
 Nokia Lumia 800 is claimed to have "sound quality problems" when using low impedance headphones like the supplied ones. Nokia has acknowledged the issue.
 Battery life. In December 2011, Nokia confirmed that some Lumia 800 devices do not use the full capacity of their battery. They also state that "only a charger with an output of 1000mA will fully charge your Lumia 800 battery." During 19–20 January 2012, two updates were made available—battery related software update and another of Windows Phone 7.5 Mango build 8107. Nokia has stated that reported issues are fixed with the update and it triples the battery life.
Problems with camera focus in certain conditions. Nokia has confirmed this.
 Daily Mobile reports an issue with screen flickering.
 Multiple reports of trouble turning device on.
 Inaccurate clock in some countries due to automatic time/date update servers being incompatible with some international carriers.
 Some carriers, such as EE, inhibited the OS update to version 7.8 leaving users stuck on version 7.5.

Connectivity
Like other Windows Phone devices, Lumia 800 uses Microsoft's Zune software on Windows PCs to synchronize user content. For Mac OS X, the device can be synchronized with Windows Phone 7 Connector software. WiFi sync is also available when the phone is charging and connected to the same network as the host PC. Lumia 800 includes the Windows Phone feature of up to 25 GB free OneDrive storage in Microsoft's cloud service.

See also

 Windows Phone
 Nokia Lumia 610
 Nokia Lumia 710
 Nokia Lumia 900

References

Microsoft Lumia
Mobile phones introduced in 2011
Discontinued smartphones
Windows Phone devices
Videotelephony
Nokia smartphones